Rosenkranz is the German word for rosary.

Rosenkranz, Rosenkrantz, Rosencrance, Rosencrans or Rosencrantz may refer to:

 Rosencrantz and Guildenstern, two characters in Shakespeare's Hamlet
 Rosencrantz and Guildenstern Are Dead, a 1966 play by Tom Stoppard
 Rosencrantz and Guildenstern Are Dead (film), a 1990 film based upon the play
 Rosenkrantz Tower, a landmark in Bergen, Norway
 Rosencrantz, a fictional character in the video game Onimusha: Dawn of Dreams

People
 Rosenkrantz (family)
 Barbara Rosenkranz (born 1958), Austrian politician
 Carlos Fernando Rosenkrantz (born 1958), Argentine lawyer and judge
 Eva Rosencrans (1901-1994), American fashion designer
 George Rosenkranz (1916–2019), Mexican steroid chemist and contract bridge player
 Rosenkranz double and redouble, contract bridge terms for conventions created by George Rosenkranz.
 Hans Rosencrantz (1890–1916), German flying ace
 Johann Karl Friedrich Rosenkranz (1805–1879), German philosopher
 Marcus Gjøe Rosenkrantz (1762–1838), Norwegian minister
 Nicholas Quinn Rosenkranz (born 1970), a law professor at Georgetown University Law Center
 Pernille Rosenkrantz-Theil (born 1977), Danish member of Parliament
 Robert Rosencrans, (1927-2006), American cable television pioneer
 Robert Rosenkranz (born 1942), American philanthropist
 Timme Rosenkrantz baron, (1911–1969) Danish author and jazz enthusiast, active in the 1930s and 1940s

See also
 Rosecrans (disambiguation)

German-language surnames
Surnames from ornamental names